Joseph Thomas Newsome (1869–1942) was the first African-American lawyer in post-Civil War Newport News, Virginia, to practice before the Virginia Supreme Court.  Newsome was a respected lawyer, newspaper editor and civic leader who hosted many up and coming African-Americans in his historic Queen Anne home including, Booker T. Washington.

Newsome was the editor of the Newport News Star, a weekly African-American publication.

The J. Thomas Newsome House was listed on the National Register of Historic Places in 1990, and is open to the public.

References

External links
Newsome House
Historic Marker

Virginia lawyers
1869 births
1942 deaths